Charles Lynn 'Cowboy' Davies (born 30 December 1929) was a Welsh international rugby union wing who played club rugby for several clubs including Llanelli and Cardiff. He won three caps for Wales. He also represented the Welsh Amateur Athletic Association in 1957.

Rugby career
Davies played rugby from a young age and represented the Wales Schools team. As an adult, Davies played for several rugby clubs before playing for first class teams, Llanelli and Cardiff, but it was while he was with Cardiff that he was selected to represent Wales. All his international appearances were part of the 1956 Five Nations Championship, and his first match was against England under the captaincy of Cliff Morgan. Wales won the game 8-3, and Davies scored a try on his debut after a forty-yard dash. Davies was reselected for the very next match against Scotland, in which Davies again succeeded in scoring a try. His final game was against Ireland, who spoiled Welsh attempts at winning the Triple Crown by beating Wales 11-3 at Lansdowne Road.

International matches played
Wales
  1956
  1956
  1956

Bibliography

References

Welsh rugby union players
Wales international rugby union players
Rugby union wings
1929 births
Living people
Cardiff RFC players
Llanelli RFC players
Glamorgan Wanderers RFC players
People educated at Queen Elizabeth High School, Carmarthen
Rugby union players from Carmarthenshire